Music from Siesta is an album released in 1987 by Miles Davis and Marcus Miller. It is the soundtrack of the 1987 film Siesta, directed by Mary Lambert.

Track listing
All songs composed by Marcus Miller, except "Theme for Augustine" by Miles Davis & Marcus Miller

"Lost in Madrid, Part 1" - 1:48
"Siesta / Kitt's Kiss / Lost in Madrid, Part 2" - 6:54
"Theme for Augustine / Wind / Seduction / Kiss" - 6:33
"Submission" - 2:32
"Lost in Madrid, Part 3" - 0:49
"Conchita / Lament" - 6:43
"Lost in Madrid, Part 4 / Rat Dance / The Call" - 1:41
"Claire / Lost in Madrid, Part 5" - 4:33
"Afterglow" - 1:41
"Los Feliz" - 4:35

Performers
 Miles Davis - trumpet
 Marcus Miller - bass, bass clarinet, etc.
 John Scofield - acoustic guitar on "Siesta"
 Omar Hakim - drums on "Siesta"
 Earl Klugh - classical guitar on "Claire"
 James Walker - flute on "Los Feliz"
 Jason Miles - synthesizer programming

References

Marcus Miller albums
Drama film soundtracks
1987 soundtrack albums
Warner Records soundtracks
Miles Davis soundtracks
Albums produced by Marcus Miller